Hilary Palma (born January 5, 1997) is a Peruvian volleyball player who plays for the Peru national team. Palma was born in Trujillo, and was part of the team that won gold at the 2012 Youth South American Championship, the first gold medal for Peruvian volleyball in that category after 32 years and the first gold in any category in 19 years.

Clubs
  Sporting Cristal (2011–present)

Awards

Individuals
 2012 Liga Nacional Juvenil de Voleibol Femenino "Best Receiver"
 2013 Liga Nacional Menor de Voleibol Femenino "Most Valuable Player"
 2013 Liga Nacional Menor de Voleibol Femenino "Best Scorer"
 2013 Liga Nacional Menor de Voleibol Femenino "Best Spiker"

National team

Junior team
 2011 U16 South American Championship -  Silver Medal
 2012 Junior South American Championship -  Silver Medal
 2012 Youth South American Championship -  Gold Medal

References

1997 births
Living people
People from Trujillo, Peru
Sportspeople from Lima
Peruvian women's volleyball players
21st-century Peruvian women